Norbert Csölle (born 18 June 1992) is a Slovak football midfielder  of Hungarian ethnicity who currently plays for the Slovak Corgoň Liga club FK DAC 1904 Dunajská Streda.

External links
FK DAC 1904 Dunajská Streda profile

References

1992 births
Living people
Slovak footballers
Association football midfielders
FC DAC 1904 Dunajská Streda players
Slovak Super Liga players
Hungarians in Slovakia